Paladin Energy Ltd is a Western Australian based uranium production company.

It currently has one operating mine in Africa; the Langer Heinrich mine (LHM) in Namibia. Paladin was listed on the Australian, OTC and Namibian Stock Exchanges, as well as the Munich, Berlin, Stuttgart and Frankfurt Exchanges. It also owns deposits in Western Australia.

As of February 2018, Paladin is in the process of restructuring, having filed for insolvency in July 2017.

History
Uranerz Australia started operations in Perth, Western Australia, in 1970 with John Borshoff, Paladin's managing director/CEO, serving as Chief executive from 1986 to 1991. Uranerz, the Australian arm of German-based uranium mining house Uranerzbergbau, explored throughout Australia, New Zealand, and Africa, focusing primarily on uranium. When Uranerz decided to close its Australian operations, John Borshoff acquired its extensive proprietary databases, which subsequently formed the nucleus for the public float of Paladin in 1994.

In February 2008, Paladin, in conjunction with joint venture partner Cameco, were selected from a highly competitive field to explore the Angela and Pamela deposits located approximately 25 km south of Alice Springs in the Northern Territory. Following successful completion of two drilling programmes, an updated Mineral Resource estimate was completed by the joint venture partners in July 2011. 

In February 2009, Paladin completed the takeover of Fusion Resources, adding the Duke Batman and Honey Pot deposits to the existing Mount Isa project area. The capacity of the LHM operation has been successfully expanded to a production rate of 5.2Mlb per annum.

According to information released by WikiLeaks in 2010, BHP Billiton attempted to lobby the Australian government in order to block the Aluminium Corporation of China (Chinalco) investment in Rio Tinto.

In 2012, Paladin joined forces with Rio Tinto to block the sales of BHP Billiton's Australian uranium deposit to Canadian mining company, Cameco.

Founder of Paladin, John Borshoff stepped down as CEO in 2015 as part of a board decision. Alexander Molyneux, took over as interim CEO of the company. In 2016, The Australian reported that Paladin may be in talks with Russian owned ARMZ Uranium Holding as well as China National Nuclear Corporation. CNNC is a 25% owner in Paladin's Namibian mine Langer Heinrich.

Paladin posted a loss of $22,9 million after tax in the six months to 31 December 2015.

In 2016, Paladin announced the sale of non-core Australian exploration assets to Uranium Africa. The value of the sale was A$2.5 million and included the Oobagoma project in Western Australia and Pamela/Angela project in the Northern Territory.

In 2017, Paladin filed for insolvency, due to its high debt and consistently low uranium prices. The stock was also delisted from the Toronto Stock Exchange.

In June 2018, former Newcrest executive Scott Sullivan was appointed to take over the CEO responsibilities from Alexander Molyneux.

Uranium projects 
The Company’s uranium projects include Langer Heinrich in Namibia and Manyingee in Western Australia. Each of these projects had feasibility studies carried out by previous owners during the 1980s, and Paladin secured them at low cost during the depressed uranium market.

Paladin has augmented its resource base in Australia through the acquisition of Valhalla Uranium Pty Ltd, whose primary assets are the 50% joint venture interests in the Valhalla and Skal deposits near Mount Isa in Queensland and 41.71% ownership of the Bigrlyi deposit in the Northern Territory.

Paladin also has an 82.08% controlling interest in Summit Resources Limited, Valhalla's joint venture partner at Mount Isa and the holder of other promising exploration titles in the region.

African Focus

Namibia
Langer Heinrich mine in Namibia is Paladin's flagship project. Having reached its initial production of 2.7Mlb U3O8 per annum in 2008, the mine completed its Stage 2 ramp-up to 3.7Mlb per annum in the 2010 financial year. Subsequently, the company has completed a Stage 3 expansion and began producing at a 5.2Mlb per annum rate. An additional Stage 4 expansion review is currently nearing finalisation with the view to potentially increasing production up to 10Mlb per annum at a later date when the economics justify the additional investment required. Substantial technical work has been completed on this project since its discovery in 1973, mainly by Gencor (the original explorer), a large South African mining house that evolved into BHP. Paladin acquired Langer Heinrich in 2002, and started a BFS in 2004.

Paladin's Board approved the development proposal at a capital cost of US$92M in 2005; site works began in September 2005;and, the project construction was completed on time and within budget. The mine was officially opened by the President of the Republic of Namibia in March 2007.

In July 2016, it was reported that Paladin was looking to sell a further 24% stake in the Langer Heinrich mine to an unnamed buyer.

In subsequent reports, it was stated that the buyer would be a division of the state-owned China National Nuclear Corporation (CNNC). The value is expected to be $175 million. However, in December 2016, Paladin reported that the sale had been delayed.

Malawi
Kayelekera mine in Malawi was the Company's second mine. A Development Agreement with the Government of Malawi was executed in February 2007, which provided fiscal stability for the project for ten years. Kayelekera was officially opened in April 2009 and has operated at designed production rates of 3.3Mlb U3O8. Project life is expected to run for at least an additional 8 years with exploration underway to identify feedstocks to extend the current project life.

The uranium development in Malawi has been besieged by issues and international media attention since 2008. A report presented by the United Nations Human Rights Commission argued that Malawi would lose money and resources over the life of the mine.

In 2014, Paladin suspended production at Kayelekera, citing lowered uranium prices at the reason for suspension.

Canada
In February 2011, Paladin completed the acquisition of its first Canadian project. Paladin acquired the uranium assets of Canadian company Aurora Energy Resources Inc. (Aurora) which added a significant tenement package in the highly prospective Central Mineral Belt (CMB) in the province of Newfoundland and Labrador. Aurora had already established a Mineral Resource base of 40.2Mt at 0.09% U3O8 (83.8Mlb) of Measured and Indicated category material, with an additional 29.0Mt at 0.08% U3O8 (53.0Mlb) of Inferred category resources.

In 2015, the Canadian Federal government granted an exemption to the current regulations on foreign ownership of active producing mines in Canada. Paladin was granted the right to have a majority ownership stake in the Michelin uranium mine, located in Newfoundland. Paladin was able to secure the exemption by demonstrating that no suitable Canadian owned company was attracted to the venture.

Australian uranium mining ban
A uranium mining ban dating back to 1989 had been in place, hindering the group's Australian activities for more than a decade. This ban was overturned in October 2012, paving the way for firms like Paladin to take advantage of the vast resources available; exploration had not been prohibited and thus the reserves have been targeted and are ready for mining.

However, it was not all of Australia that lifted the ban. In 2015, the Government of Queensland reinstated the ban on all uranium mining activity. South Australia is still undertaking research into the effect of uranium mining in the state. Mining is still banned in New South Wales, Victoria and Tasmania.

Paladin owns the Valhalla deposit with both measured and indicated uranium resources of 24,425tU.

Corporate governance
 Cliff Lawrenson – Chairman – Non-executive (Corporate)
 Ian Purdy – CEO (Commercial / Mining / Finance)
 Peter Main – Director – Non-executive (Finance)
 Peter Watson – Director – Non-executive (Technical)
 Joanne Palmer – Director – Non-executive (Finance)
 Melissa Holzberger - Director - Non-executive (Corporate
 Jeremy Ryan - Company Secretary
 Anna Sudlow – Chief Financial Officer

References

Companies based in Perth, Western Australia
Companies formerly listed on the Toronto Stock Exchange
Companies listed on the Australian Securities Exchange
Energy companies established in 1993
Uranium mining companies of Australia
1993 establishments in Australia